Edith Carrington (1853–1929) was a prominent English animal rights activist and promoter of vegetarianism. She was for sometime an artist, but began to write books on animals from 1889. She was a vocal opponent of Eleanor Anne Ormerod's campaign seeking the extermination of the house sparrow and was an anti-vivisectionist.

Life and work 
Carrington was born in Swainswick, Bath, Somerset to Henry Edmund Carrington and Emily Heywood Johns (1814–1890). Coming from a wealthy family, she was influenced by Charles Kingsley who introduced her to study natural history and took on herself the "wish for no higher mission than to live and die in the cause of God's beautiful and sinless mute creatures." She wrote regularly in The Animals' Friend (established in 1894) and was a collaborator of Henry Stephens Salt and was a participant in the Humanitarian League (established 1891).Edith Carrington (1894). Miss Edith Carrington: Portrait and Autobiography. The Animals' Friend (August), 1:24.

Carrington's first book Stories for Somebody was written when she was thirty-five. She later wrote a number of animal stories for children. One series Animal Life Readers edited by Carrington and Ernest Bell was illustrated by Harrison Weir and others. She also ran a children's magazine called Our Animal Brothers.

Selected publications

 Workers Without Wage (1893)
 The Farmer and the Birds (1898)
 Spare the Sparrow (1897)
 Man's Helpers (1897)
 Wonderful Tools (1897)
 Nobody's Business (1891)
 Stories for Somebody
 Flower Folk
 Friendship of Animals
 Ten Tales Without a Title
 Bread and Butter Stories
 Appeals on behalf of the Speechless: A Series of Tracts
 The Extermination of Birds
 A Narrow, Narrow World
 A Story of Wings
 Five Stars in a Little Pool
 The Dog: His Rights and Wrongs
 The Cat: Her Place in Society and Treatment
 Animals in the Wrong Place
 Anecdotes of Horses
 The Ass, his Welfare, Wants, and Woes
 Ages Ago
 Mrs Trimmer's History of the Robins and Keeper's Travels (1895)
 From Many Lands (1895)
 Dick and His Cat (1895)

References

External links

 "Henry S. Salt, "Edith Carrington’s Writings", Vegetarian Review, November 1896

1853 births
1929 deaths
Anti-vivisectionists
British vegetarianism activists
English animal rights activists
English children's writers
English nature writers